Callosa Deportiva Club de Fútbol is a Spanish football club that based in Callosa de Segura, in the Valencian Community. Founded in 1933, for the 2022-23 season it plays in Regional Preferente – Group 4, holding home matches at the Estadio El Palmeral, with a capacity of 1,090 people.

Season to season

13 seasons in Tercera División
1 season in Tercera División RFEF

External links
Futbolme.com profile
Valencian FF profile

Football clubs in the Valencian Community
Divisiones Regionales de Fútbol clubs
Province of Alicante